Jovesa Seuseu "Jojo" Naivalu (born 19 March 1978) is a Fiji-American athlete.  
In the sport of athletics, Naivalu is the Fiji national record holder in both the 110 metres hurdles and the 400 metres hurdles. He represented Fiji at the 1996 Summer Olympics and the 1996 World Junior Championships in Athletics in the 110 metres hurdles.

In the sport of rugby union he represented the United States from 2000–2004 winning 10 caps. He also represented the United States in rugby sevens. During the 2008/09 season he played for Frankfurt SC in the Rugby-Bundesliga in Germany, making 15 appearances for the club.

Biography
Naivalu was born 19 March 1978 in Lautoka, Fiji. Naivalu moved to the United States in 1986. He competed for Fremont High School in Sunnyvale, California, winning the 110 metres hurdles at the CIF California State Meet in 1995 and 1996.

Naivalu was selected to the small Fiji 1996 Olympic team that year. The Olympic hurdles are 3" higher than they are in high school.  Naivalu finished 6th in his qualifying heat in the 110 metres hurdles.  Running hurdles he was used to, a month later he took a bronze medal at the IAAF World Junior Championships in Athletics.
The following year, he set the Fijian national record of 13.82 (+0.3) in the 110 metres hurdles in the qualifying round of the IAAF World Championships. He competed in the 1999 and 2003 (South) Pacific Games, winning the 110 hurdles and finishing second in the 400 metres hurdles, setting the national record 51.67 in the latter in 1999 at Santa Rita, Guam.

He turned down a scholarship to the University of North Carolina.

Rugby
The Fiji Olympic Committee wasn't doling out money to support athletes, so Naivalu followed his brother Saimoni into the world of professional rugby, playing for the San Jose Seahawks. Still making a $300 a game, he had to work security for grocery stores to support himself.

Defilement and imprisonment 
In May 2003, Naivalu was arrested for defiling his 16-year old girlfriend. He was charged and jailed for seven years. After being released from jail, he left for Fiji where he currently resides and coaches the Suva Grammar School athletics team for the Coke Games

Athletics achievements

References

External links
 
 
 

1978 births
Living people
Olympic athletes of Fiji
Commonwealth Games competitors for Fiji
American male hurdlers
Fijian male hurdlers
Athletes (track and field) at the 1996 Summer Olympics
Athletes (track and field) at the 1998 Commonwealth Games
Fijian rugby union players
American rugby union players
Rugby union wings
United States international rugby union players
Male rugby sevens players
SC 1880 Frankfurt players
Sportspeople from Sunnyvale, California
Track and field athletes from San Jose, California
Fijian emigrants to the United States
American expatriate rugby union players
Fijian expatriate rugby union players
Expatriate rugby union players in Germany
American expatriate sportspeople in Germany
Fijian expatriate sportspeople in Germany
Track and field athletes from California
United States international rugby sevens players
Sportspeople from Lautoka
American people of I-Taukei Fijian descent
I-Taukei Fijian people